The House of Bonde is an ancient Swedish noble family. Today, two branches of the family survive, the barons of the House of Bonde which is number 20 in the Swedish House of Nobility and the counts of the House of Bonde af Björnö, number 41.

Bonde (Swedish, 'farmer', plural bönder) was also one of the four estates of the Swedish Riksdag of the Estates.

People
Prominent members and others bearing the name include:
 Tord Bonde (c. 1350s–1417), medieval Swedish magnate
 Charles VIII of Sweden (Karl Knutsson Bonde) ; 1408/1409–1470), King, Charles I of Norway
 Magdalena of Sweden (1445–1495), Princess
 Gustaf Bonde (1620–1667), Swedish statesman
 Wilhelmina Bonde (1817–1899), Swedish courtier
 Jens-Peter Bonde (1948–2021), Danish politician
 Carl Bonde (1872–1957), Swedish Army officer, equerry
Carl C:son Bonde (1897–1990), Swedish Army officer
Thord Bonde (1900–1969), Swedish Army officer
Gustaf Bonde (1911–1977), Swedish diplomat
Oskar Bonde (born 1979), Swedish drummer
Line Bonde (born 1979), Danish fighter pilot

References

Swedish noble families